The Navy of El Salvador is the naval arm of the Armed Forces of El Salvador. The navy was founded on 12 October 1951.

Built around craft and duties absorbed from the Salvadoran Coast Guard, the navy is primarily composed of patrol boats tasked with coastal patrol and fishery protection. The current fleet is made up of three Camcraft-type patrol boats originally built in the United States for use as oilfield crew boats. New patrol boats have been ordered from Chile to replace or supplement the current, aging ships.

Current fleet

Future fleet
Two (possibly three) new patrol boats have been ordered from Chile.  They will be slightly larger than the current patrol boats with a displacement of 107 tons, measure 32.7 x 6.7 x 2.1 meters, and have a crew of 14.  They will also be slightly slower with a top speed of 18 knots.  Armament will be 1 x 20mm gun, and one 12.7mm machine gun.

References

El Salvador
Military of El Salvador